Mohammad Khodabandehlo (born 7 September 1999) is an Iranian footballer who plays as a midfielder for Persian Gulf Pro League side Zob Ahan.

Career statistics

Club

Notes

References

External links

1999 births
Living people
Iranian footballers
Persian Gulf Pro League players
Paykan F.C. players
Association football midfielders
Footballers at the 2018 Asian Games
Asian Games competitors for Iran